Hemigomphus magela is a species of dragonfly of the family Gomphidae, 
known as the Kakadu vicetail. 
It is a small, black and yellow dragonfly, endemic to Northern Territory, Australia, where it inhabits streams.

Gallery

See also
 List of Odonata species of Australia

References

Gomphidae
Odonata of Australia
Endemic fauna of Australia
Taxa named by J.A.L. (Tony) Watson
Insects described in 1991